From N.Y. is the second studio album from the a cappella group Rockapella. The album was a mixture of original material and covers of U.S. pop tunes.

Track listing

Personnel
Scott Leonard – high tenor
Sean Altman – tenor
Elliott Kerman – baritone
Barry Carl – bass

Special Appearances
David Yazbek – vocal percussion – "I Like You Very Much"

1992 albums
Rockapella albums